The 1991 Austrian motorcycle Grand Prix was the seventh round of the 1991 Grand Prix motorcycle racing season. It took place on the weekend of 7–9 June 1991 at the Salzburgring.

500 cc race report
Mick Doohan dominates qualifying with more than a second under Kevin Schwantz in 2nd place.

At the start, Wayne Rainey gets the first turn from Wayne Gardner, Doohan and John Kocinski. Doohan gets past Gardner and he and Rainey start forming a gap at the front. Kocinski starts putting pressure on Gardner.

Doohan takes the lead, with Rainey doing everything he can to stay in contact. Schwantz starts moving through the field. It ends in that order.

Schwantz complains that with two laps to go, Gardner almost pushed him into a barrier, and there are heated words after the race.

500 cc classification

250 cc classification

125 cc classification

Sidecar classification

References

Austrian motorcycle Grand Prix
Austrian
Motorcycle Grand Prix